Berchidda is an Italian commune in the province of Sassari, region and island of Sardinia, located about  north of Cagliari and about  southwest of Olbia.

It is located near Lake Coghinas in a hilly area bordered on the north by the Limbara mountain range.

Berchidda borders the following municipalities: Alà dei Sardi, Calangianus, Monti, Oschiri, Tempio Pausania.

Culture 

A jazz festival called Time in Jazz takes place every year in Berchidda since 1988. Paolo Fresu, the Sardinian trumpet player, born in Berchidda in 1961, is the founder and the organizer of this festival.

Transportation
It is connected by the SS 131 State Road and has a station on the Cagliari-Olbia-Golfo Aranci railway.

References

External links
 Time in Jazz festival's official site

Cities and towns in Sardinia